Samuel S. Triplett (December 18, 1869 – August 26, 1957) was a United States Navy sailor and a recipient of the United States military's highest decoration—the Medal of Honor—for his actions in the Spanish–American War.

Biography
On July 26, and July 27, 1898, he took part in a demining operation in Guantanamo Bay, Cuba. He was awarded the Medal of Honor five months later, on December 14, 1898, for his actions during the operation.

Triplett reached the rank of Chief Boatswain's Mate before leaving the Navy.  He was a member of the American Legion and the Veterans of Foreign Wars.

He died at age 87 and is buried in North Edna Cemetery, Edna, Kansas.

Awards
Medal of Honor
Good Conduct Medal
Sampson Medal
Spanish Campaign Medal
World War I Victory Medal

Medal of Honor citation
Rank and organization: Ordinary Seaman, U.S. Navy. Born: December 18, 1869, Chenokeeke, Kans. Accredited to: New York. G.O. No.: 500, December 14, 1898.

Citation:
On board the U.S.S. Marblehead at the approaches to Caimanera, Guantanamo Bay, Cuba, 26 and 27 July 1898. Displaying heroism, Triplett took part in the perilous work of sweeping for and disabling 27 contact mines during this period.

See also

 List of Medal of Honor recipients
 List of Medal of Honor recipients for the Spanish–American War

Notes

References

 
 
 

1869 births
1957 deaths
American military personnel of the Spanish–American War
United States Navy Medal of Honor recipients
People from Cherokee, Kansas
United States Navy sailors
Burials in Kansas
Spanish–American War recipients of the Medal of Honor
Military personnel from Kansas